Cipriano Muñoz y Manzano, 2nd Count of la Viñaza, (Zaragoza, 3 October 1862 – Biarritz, France, 23  November 1, 1933) was a Spanish diplomat and academic who served as a deputy to the Spanish Congress and published notable works on linguistics, philology, and art history.

Biography

He was the son of Cipriano Muñoz y Ostaled, first Conde de La Viñaza, a Spanish countship awarded on 27 November 1871 by the brief-reigning King Amadeo I of Spain. He studied Law and Philosophy at Zaragoza University and earned a Doctoral degree in Philosophy from the University of Madrid.

Muñoz was Congressional deputy for Ejea de los Caballeros, Zaragoza, from 1891 to 1893, 1893 to 1894, and 1894 to 1896. He served later as Spanish Ambassador in Russia and Italy. He became Senator for the province of Huesca and, on 15 November 1910, a grandee of Spain.

He was enrolled a member of the Royal Spanish Academy in 1895, aged 33, lecturing at his appointment reception on satirical–political poetry in Spanish literature. He was a member also of the Royal Spanish Academy of History, lecturing at his appointment reception on the Chroniclers of the Kingdom of Aragon. He was awarded the Great Cross with Diamonds of the Russian Order of Saint Alexander Nevsky, and received honors also from Portugal, Italy, Austria, Belgium, Peru, Serbia, Bulgaria, and other countries.

He died in Biarritz, France, aged 71.

Here is an excerpt from "Movimiento nobiliario para 1934":

Publications
Muñoz wrote a number of books, some of which remain influential in the history of the Spanish language today.

 Bibliografía Española de Lenguas Indigenas de América (Spanish bibliography of indigenous American languages), Madrid, Ed. Sucesores de Rivadeneyra, xxv + 427 pages, 1892, reprinted by Father Carmelo Sáenz de Santa María, 1977: . A catalogue of 1,100 works in indigenous American languages with Spanish translations, printed from the 16th to 19th centuries. The bibliography includes profiles of the works' authors, many Spanish-born or mixed race bilingual descendants of Spanish and Indian parents. Many of the books concern the teaching of Christianity in aboriginal American languages.
Escritos de los portugueses y castellanos referentes a las lenguas de China y del Japón: estudio bibliográfico por el conde de la Viñaza, Cipriano Muñoz y Manzano (Portuguese and Castilian writings on the languages of China and Japan: a bibliographic study for the conde de la Viñaza, Cipriano Muñoz y Manzano. Published:  Lisboa,  M. Gomez and also London, B. Quaritch, 1892. A Collection of Studies on the Chinese and Japanese Languages Carried Out by Spanish and Portuguese Travelers and Settlers from the Sixteenth to the Nineteenth Centuries.

Poesía  satírico – política bajo el Reinado de los últimos Austrias, Discurso de Ingreso en la Real Academia Española del 16 de junio 1893, contestación del Académico Alejandro Pidal. An account of political gossip, libels and poems circulated at the Madrid Court during the second half of the 17th century.
Biblioteca Histórica de la Filología Castellana. 3 vols., Imprenta de Manuel Tello, Madrid (1893); facsimile by Linotipias Montsarrat, Ediciones Atlas, Madrid (1978), XXXV + 1113 pp.
Santa Teresa de Jesús: Ensayo Crítico (Santa Teresa de Jesús: A Critical Essay), por el Conde de la Viñaza.
Adiciones al "Diccionario histórico de los muy ilustres profesores de Bellas Artes en España" de Ceán Bermúdez. An Expansion on the Much Sought After and Rare  6-Volume Edition of the Year 1800 on Over Three Centuries of Spanish Artists, Mainly Painters,  by Juan Agustín Ceán Bermúdez,  (Gijón, 17 September 1749 – Madrid, 3 December  1829). The original volumes have been reprinted by Ediciones Akal, Madrid (2001), 

Art historians have credited him as the first Spaniard to produce a catalogue of the works of Aragonese painter Francisco de Goya.

References
Gran Enciclopedia de España, (1999), 22 vols. 11,052 pages, in  vol 14, page 6,501 to 6,996, 

 Juan Agustín Ceán Bermúdez – A biography of 18th-century Spanish painting historian Juan Agustín Ceán Bermúdez from Spanish Wikipedia. (In Spanish)

1862 births
1933 deaths
Spanish diplomats
Members of the Royal Spanish Academy
Grandees of Spain